Remigio Iza Urcullu (20 January 1883 – 4 May 1960) was a Spanish footballer who played as a forward for Athletic Club. The highlight of his career was scoring the winning goal of the 1910 UECF Copa del Rey Final against Vasconia.

Biography
Together with José María Belauste, Luis Hurtado and Martyn Veitch, he was part of the great Athletic side that won back-to-back Copa del Rey titles in 1910 and 1911, in which Iza contributed with the winning goal of the 1910 final in a 1–0 win over Vasconia. He also featured in the 1911 Copa del Rey Final in a convincing 3–1 win over RCD Espanyol.

Honours
Athletic Bilbao
Copa del Rey:
Champions (2): 1910 and 1911

References

1883 births
1980 deaths
Spanish footballers
Sportspeople from Biscay
Association football midfielders
People from Abanto y Ciérbana-Abanto Zierbena
Footballers from the Basque Country (autonomous community)
Athletic Bilbao footballers